Agrupación Deportiva Almudévar is a Spanish football team based in Almudévar, in the autonomous community of Aragon. Founded in 1965, it plays in Tercera División, holding home matches at Estadio Virgen de la Corona.

The club was a reserve team of SD Huesca from 2011 to 2019.

Season to season
As an independent team

As SD Huesca's reserve team

As an independent team

11 seasons in Tercera División

Current squad

References

External links
La Preferente team profile 
Soccerway team profile

Football clubs in Aragon
Association football clubs established in 1965
1965 establishments in Spain
SD Huesca